Tehran (Sadeghiyeh) Metro Station is the junction of Tehran Metro Line 2 and Tehran Metro Line 5. It is located in Sadeghiye neighborhood near Mohammad Ali Jenah Expressway and Tehran-Karaj Freeway. It is the west end of Line 2 and the east end of Line 5. The next station in Line 2 is Tarasht Metro Station and the next station in Line 5 is Eram-e Sabz Metro Station. It also has a big parking lot and is considered as the most crowded Tehran metro station. It is currently the only above ground station on Tehran Metro Line 2.

References

Tehran Metro stations